Bryullov, Bryulov, Briullov or Briuloff, a Russian masculine surname, derives from the French surname Brulleau; its feminine counterpart is Bryullova. It may refer to (for example):

 Alexander Brullov (1798–1877), Russian artist
 Karl Bryullov (1799–1852), Russian painter, brother of Alexander

Russian-language surnames